Charles Joseph Chant (born August 7, 1951) is a former American Major League Baseball outfielder. He played for the Oakland Athletics during the  season and the St. Louis Cardinals during the  season.

References

1951 births
Living people
Oakland Athletics players
St. Louis Cardinals players
Major League Baseball outfielders
Baseball players from California
Tri-City A's players
Coos Bay-North Bend A's players
Burlington Bees players
Birmingham A's players
Tucson Toros players
Tulsa Oilers (baseball) players
New Orleans Pelicans (baseball) players
Arkansas Travelers players